George Browne may refer to:

Sir George Browne (died 1483) (1440–1483), took part in Buckingham's rebellion
George Browne (archbishop of Dublin) (died 1556), Anglican bishop in Ireland
George Browne (by 1517–62 or later), MP for Berwick-upon-Tweed
George Browne (died 1631) (1583–1631), English lawyer, landowner and politician
Sir George Browne (died 1661), English politician
George Browne (provost) (–1699), professor of divinity at Trinity College, Dublin
Sir George Browne, 4th Baronet (1680s–1737), Irish politician, MP for Castlebar 1713–14
George Browne (died 1782) (–1782), Irish politician, MP for Mayo 1779–82
George Browne (soldier) (1698–1792), Irish soldier of fortune, field-marshal in the Russian service
George Browne, 8th Viscount Montagu (1769–1793), English nobleman
George Browne (Lower Canada politician) (before 1794–1822), merchant and political figure in Lower Canada
George Joseph Plunket Browne (1795–1858), Irish Roman Catholic Bishop of Elphin from 1844 to 1858
George H. Browne (1818–1885), U.S. Representative from Rhode Island
George Browne (architect) (1811–1885), Irish-born Canadian architect
George Browne, 3rd Marquess of Sligo (1820–1896), Irish peer
George Forrest Browne (1833–1930), English bishop
George Browne (cricketer) (1835–1919), English cricketer 
George Eakins Browne (1837–1923), Irish politician, Member of Parliament for Mayo
Sir George Buckston Browne (1850–1945), British medical doctor and pioneer urologist
Sir George Washington Browne (1853–1939), Scottish architect
George Elmer Browne (1871–1946), American artist
George Browne (baseball) (1876–1920), American baseball player
George Browne (calypsonian) (1920–2007), Trinidadian musician known as Young Tiger
George Browne (archbishop of West Africa) (1933–1993), Anglican bishop in Africa
George Browne (umpire) (born 1934), West Indian cricket umpire
George Browne, 6th Marquess of Sligo (1856–1935), Irish peer

See also
George Brown (disambiguation)
George Broun (disambiguation)